Tonton Tapis–GB was a Belgian professional cycling team that existed in 1991. The team participated in the 1991 Tour de France.

Team roster
The following is a list of riders on the Tonton Tapis–GB squad during the 1991 season, with age given for 1 January 1991.

References

Cycling teams based in Belgium
Defunct cycling teams based in Belgium
1991 establishments in Belgium
1991 disestablishments in Belgium
Cycling teams established in 1991
Cycling teams disestablished in 1991